Contemporary classical double bass players are performers who play the double bass, the largest and lowest-pitched bowed string instrument. They perform European art music ranging from Baroque suites and Mozart-era Classical pieces to contemporary and avant-garde works in a variety of settings, ranging from huge symphony orchestras to small chamber groups, or as soloists. Historical double bassists such as Domenico Dragonetti (1763–1846) and Giovanni Bottesini (1821–1889) established a tradition for playing the instrument that was carried on in the 20th and 21st century with a number of double bass players. 

Some of the most influential contemporary classical double bass players are known as much for their contributions to pedagogy as for their performing skills, such as US bassist Oscar Zimmerman (1910–1987), known for his teaching at the Eastman School of Music and, for 44 summers at the Interlochen Music Camp in Michigan and French-Syrian bassist François Rabbath (born 1931), who developed a new bass method which divided the entire fingerboard into six positions. Bassists noted for their virtuoso solo skills include US player Gary Karr (born 1941) and Finnish bassist-composer Teppo Hauta-Aho (1941–2021).

This is a list of notable professional classical double bass players, including orchestral performers, soloists, chamber musicians, and teachers.

Historical
 Johannes Matthias Sperger (1750–1812) composer
 Domenico Dragonetti (1763–1846) composer, conductor
 Giovanni Bottesini (1821–1889) composer, conductor
 Franz Simandl (1840–1912) composer
 Edouard Nanny (1872–1943) composer
 Serge Koussevitzky (1874–1951) composer, conductor

North America

 Edwin Barker
 Jeff Bradetich
 Bruce Bransby
 Maximilian Dimoff
 Timothy Cobb
 David Currie
 Mark Dresser
 Paul Ellison
 Diana Gannett
 John Geggie
 Larry Gray
 Barry Green
 Mark Morton
 Gary Karr
 Albert Laszlo
 Eugene Levinson
 Salvatore Macchia
 Jeremy McCoy
 Linda McKnight
 Homer Mensch
 Edgar Meyer
 Orin O'Brien
 Donald Palma
 Scott Pingel
 Frank Proto
 Joel Quarrington
 Hal Robinson
 Stuart Sankey
 Karl E. H. Seigfried
 Peter Seymour
 Dennis Trembly
 Bertram Turetzky
 Frederick Zimmermann
 Oscar G. Zimmerman
 Trevor Dunn
 Monica Witni

Europe

 Leon Bosch
 Gavin Bryars
 Jurek Dybal
 Gerald Drucker
 Renaud Garcia-Fons
 Heinz Karl Gruber
 Teppo Hauta-Aho
 Rinat Ibragimov
 Jorma Katrama
 Joëlle Léandre
 Uxía Martínez Botana
 Duncan McTier
 Chi-chi Nwanoku
 Frantisek Posta 
 Franco Petracchi
 François Rabbath
 Jean-Pierre Robert
 Edicson Ruiz
 Rodney Slatford
 Allan von Schenkel
 Ludwig Streicher
 Joris Vanvinckenroye
 Rainer Zepperitz

South America
 Edicson Ruiz

Asia
 Mikyung Sung

See also 
List of jazz bassists, which includes both double bass and electric bass players
List of double bassists in popular music, which covers Blues, Folk, and other styles

Double bass

Double bass players